Namdev Public School is situated at Gurrcchapar road, Gangoh. School is running under Namdev Vikas Avam Shiksha Parsarini Samiti Gangoh. School is affiliated to C.B.S.E New Delhi. School is offered class I to XII. The school has a pollution free green environment.

See also
 List of schools in India

External links
 Namdev Public School

International schools in India
Private schools in Uttar Pradesh
Primary schools in Uttar Pradesh
High schools and secondary schools in Uttar Pradesh
Saharanpur district
2002 establishments in Uttar Pradesh
Educational institutions established in 2002